The Green Monster is a popular nickname for the  left field wall at Fenway Park, home to the Boston Red Sox of Major League Baseball.

Overview

The wall was part of the original ballpark construction of 1912, along Fenway's north side facing Lansdowne Street.  It is made of wood and was covered in tin and concrete in 1934.  It was then covered with hard plastic in 1976. A manual scoreboard is set into the wall, which has been there, in one form or another, at least as far back as 1914 (see photo at right). Despite the name, the Green Monster was not painted green until 1947; before that, it was covered with advertisements. The Monster designation is relatively new. For most of its history it was simply called "The Wall".

The Green Monster is the highest among the walls in current Major League Baseball fields; it is the second highest among all professional baseball fields (including minor leagues), as in 2007 it was surpassed by the left field wall of WellSpan Park in York, Pennsylvania, which is approximately  taller.

Ballparks occupied by professional baseball teams have often featured high fences to hide the field from external viewers, particularly behind open areas of the outfield where bleacher seating is low-lying or non-existent. The wall might also reduce the number of "cheap" home runs due to the barrier's relatively tall height above the playing surface. Fenway's wall serves both purposes. Past ballparks of Fenway's era or even later which featured high fences in-play included Baker Bowl, Washington Park, Ebbets Field, League Park, Griffith Stadium, Shibe Park, and more recently, Los Angeles Memorial Coliseum. Fenway is the last of the exceptionally high-walled major league ballparks. Relatively high walls in modern ballparks have been constructed for their novelty rather than by necessity, as Fenway's wall had been.

The Green Monster is famous for preventing home runs on many line drives that would clear the walls of other ballparks. A side effect of this is to increase the prevalence of doubles, since this is the most common result when the ball is hit off the wall (often referred to as a "wallball double"). Some left fielders, predominantly those with vast Fenway experience, have become adept at fielding caroms off the wall to throw runners out at second base or hold the batter to a single. With this short distance, many deep fly balls that could be caught by the fielder in a deeper park rebound off the wall for base hits. And while the wall turns many would-be line-drive homers into doubles it also allows some high yet shallow fly balls to clear the field of play for a home run.

During 2001 and 2002, the Green Monster's height record was temporarily beaten by the center field wall at Riverfront Stadium in Cincinnati, Ohio.  During the construction of Great American Ball Park, located right next to Riverfront Stadium, a large section of seats was removed from the center field area to make room and a  black wall was erected as a temporary batter's eye. The entire wall was in play. This new wall was often called "The Black Monster". When Riverfront Stadium was demolished in 2002, the Green Monster reclaimed the record. In honor of the famed wall, the Red Sox mascot is a furry green monster named Wally the Green Monster, joined in 2016 by his younger sister Tessie.

Features

Duffy's Cliff

From 1912 to 1933, a  mound formed an incline in front of the Green Monster, extending from the left-field foul pole to the center field flag pole. This earthwork formed a "terrace", a common feature of ballparks of the day (where a dirt-surfaced warning track would normally be today), whose purpose was to make up the difference in grade between street level and field level, as with Cincinnati's Crosley Field. It also served to double as a seating area to handle overflow crowds, another common practice of that era.

As a result of the terrace, when overflow crowds were not seated atop it, a left fielder in Fenway Park had to play the territory running uphill. Boston's first star left fielder, Duffy Lewis, mastered the skill so well that the area became known as "Duffy's Cliff". In contrast, rotund outfielder Bob Fothergill, known by the indelicate nicknames of "Fats" or "Fatty", reportedly once chased a ball up the terrace, slipped and fell, and rolled downhill.

In 1934, Red Sox owner Tom Yawkey arranged to flatten the ground in left field so that Duffy's Cliff no longer existed, and it became part of the lore of Fenway Park.

Scoreboard
Long after the much-higher location manual scoreboard from c.1914 existed (as seen in the 1914 photo), the placement of the modern "ground-level" manual scoreboard occurred in 1934. It forms the lower half of the Green Monster and is still updated by hand from behind the wall throughout the game. The American League scores are also updated from behind the wall. The National League scores need to be updated from the front of the wall between innings. There is also a board which shows the current American League East standings. Yellow numbers are used to represent in-inning scores and white numbers are used to represent final inning tallies. The numbers of the current pitchers weigh  and measure .

Carlton Fisk's "body English" when he hit his game-winning home run in Game 6 of the 1975 World Series, "waving" the ball fair, was captured on a TV camera stationed in the scoreboard.

Morse Code
The Morse Code that appears from top to bottom in the white lines of the American League scoreboard are the initials of former owners Thomas A. Yawkey and Jean R. Yawkey.

Right field
The bullpen was added along the right field wall in 1940 to shorten the distance for left-handed slugger Ted Williams' home runs to clear the fence. For years afterward, the bullpens were known as "Williamsburg".

Green Monster seating

In 1936, the Red Sox installed a  net above the Monster in order to protect the storefronts on adjoining Lansdowne Street from home run balls. The net remained until the 2002–03 offseason, when the team's new ownership constructed a new seating section atop the wall to accommodate 274 fans. Wildly popular, these "Monster seats" were part of a larger expansion plan for Fenway Park seating. The Red Sox later added a smaller seating section in 2005, dubbed the "Nation's Nest," located between the main seating section and the center field scoreboard.

The ladder
Previously, members of the grounds crew would use the ladder to retrieve home run balls from the netting hung above the wall. After the net was removed for the addition of the Monster seats, the ladder ceased to have any real function, yet it remains in place as a historic relic.

The placement of the ladder is noteworthy given the fact that it is in fair territory; it is the only such ladder in the major leagues. On many occasions, a batted ball has struck the ladder during game play, at least twice leading to an inside-the-park home run.  During a 1950s game, Red Sox outfielders Ted Williams and Jimmy Piersall both tracked a fly ball in left center, but the ball struck the ladder and caromed into center field, giving batter Jim Lemon enough time to round the bases.  Later, in 1963, the slow-footed Dick Stuart hit a high fly that ricocheted first off the ladder, and then the head of outfielder Vic Davalillo, before rolling far enough away to allow Stuart to score.

Advertisements
After the wall was painted green in 1947, advertisements did not appear on the wall until 1999, when the All-Star Game at Fenway was being promoted. Various ads have appeared above the scoreboard since then, such as the Jimmy Fund, W.B. Mason, and Granite City Electric. The Coke Bottles on the left light tower were a target for power-hitters when they were placed in 1997. These 3D advertisements were taken down before the 2008 season, when an LED sign was built above the new left-field upper deck seats. As a lead up to his 500th career home run, Manny Ramirez's home run count was tallied on the bottom of the light tower. Ads beside the manual scoreboard were added when the scoreboard was expanded. Above the manual scoreboard, where a Jimmy Fund advertisement had remained for many years, the logo for Foxwoods Resort Casino is now a prominent aspect of Fenway Park. Outside of Fenway in Kenmore Square, but able to be seen in the view above the left-field wall, is the Boston Citgo sign.

Similar and related places 
 The Red Sox current spring training home, JetBlue Park at Fenway South in Fort Myers, Florida, features a replica of the Green Monster.  JetBlue's Green Monster even has Fenway Park's 1934-vintage, manually operated scoreboard installed in it.
 Fluor Field at the West End, home of the Greenville Drive of the High-Single A Carolina League, has a "Greenville Monster" as well; much as jetBlue Park in Florida does, Fluor Field's dimensions replicate exactly those of Fenway Park. The Drive is the High-A affiliate of the Red Sox, having been elevated from Single-A in the 2021 reorganization of Minor League Baseball.
 Hadlock Field, home of the Portland Sea Dogs, the AA affiliates of the Boston Red Sox. This stadium boasts a replica of the Green Monster, nicknamed the "Maine Monster".
 Griffith Stadium in Washington, D.C., the longtime home of the Washington Senators, had its own version of the Green Monster---in right field.
 Hawkins Field, home of the Vanderbilt University Commodores baseball program features their own, version of the Green Monster with a scoreboard on top.
 The former (demolished 2014) Hubert H. Humphrey Metrodome was the previous home of the University of Minnesota Golden Gophers baseball program and the Minnesota Twins. A -high advertising-covered tarp hung over the fold-away football seating in right field and was derisively referred to as the "Hefty Bag" or "Baggie" for its black garbage bag-like appearance. As hitting the exposed folded seats above it was considered a home run and the tarp provided a trampoline-like bounce to assure a double, it was an attractive target for left-handed power hitters.
 Minute Maid Park, home of the Houston Astros, has a wall inspired by the Green Monster in left field, atop which is mounted a train reminiscent of the operating days of the adjacent Union Station.
 Pro Player Stadium, the former home of the Florida Marlins, featured a smaller 'Teal Monster' in left field from the team's original 1992 season until 2009, when the display was replaced by ad hoardings for the remaining 2010 and 2011 seasons before their move to Marlins Park. The board started out as manual but eventually was converted to a digital eggcrate display with remote control.
 PeoplesBank Park, home of the York Revolution, has "The Arch Nemesis" that is 6 inches (152 mm) taller than the Green Monster.
 RE/MAX Field, home of the Edmonton Riverhawks, has a  green monster  from home plate.
 Fukuoka Dome, home of the Fukuoka SoftBank Hawks, has a 5.84-meter-high (19.2-foot-high) "Green Monster" in the outfield.
 The Kingdome in Seattle, Washington had a high right field wall that was dubbed "The Walla-Walla" after Walla Walla, Washington.
 Durham Bulls Athletic Park, home of the Durham Bulls, AAA affiliate of the Tampa Bay Rays, has a  wall in left field named the "Blue Monster".
 Ogren Park at Allegiance Field, home of the Missoula PaddleHeads of the Pioneer League, has a 27-foot wall in right field, located 287 feet from home plate as measured along the foul line. The park has a similar wall that is 309 feet from home plate, but not as tall.
 PNC Park, home of the Pittsburgh Pirates, has a -high right field wall, paying homage to the Pirates' Hall of Fame right fielder Roberto Clemente, who wore #21.
 McCormick Field, home of the Asheville Tourists, has a -high right field wall.
 Page Stadium, the field for the Loyola Marymount University baseball team, also boasts a replica of the Green Monster in left field.
 John F. Fitzgerald Expressway, a part of Interstate 93 through downtown Boston, now underground as a result of the construction project known as the "Big Dig", was for many years an elevated expressway, held up with green girders, and was derided as "Boston's other Green Monster".
 Bush Field, home of the Class AA New Haven Ravens from 1994 to 2003, and now only used by Yale University's team, features a 35-foot high green metal wall in center field, which not only features a manual scoreboard, but also displays balls, strikes and outs with colored lights, just like Fenway's Green Monster.

See also

References

External links 
 

Boston Red Sox
Fenway Sports Group
Fenway–Kenmore
Buildings and structures in Boston